Broughton Village is a locality on the border of the Kiama and Shoalhaven local government areas in New South Wales, Australia. It lies on the Princes Highway about 18 southwest of Kiama and 39 km north of Nowra and on Broughton Creek. Broughton Village is to not to be confused with Broughton, a locality that lies to its immediate southwest or Broughton Vale, which lies to its immediate northwest.

References

Localities in New South Wales
City of Shoalhaven
Municipality of Kiama